The 2020–21 Sheffield Shield season was the 119th season of the Sheffield Shield, the domestic first-class cricket competition in Australia. On 26 June 2020, Cricket Australia confirmed all the squads for the 2020–21 domestic cricket season. Cricket Australia also confirmed that the tournament would use the Kookaburra ball for all the matches, after using the Duke ball since the 2016–17 season. New South Wales were the defending champions.

Due to the COVID-19 pandemic, the first four rounds of the season are being played at four venues in Adelaide. With further restrictions due to the pandemic in Australia, the first round match between New South Wales and Victoria was scheduled to take place from 17 November 2020, because of extra measures for people travelling into South Australia from Victoria. However, on 12 October 2020, Victoria's first two matches were postponed due to the extra quarantine restrictions.

Round three of the tournament saw a new record partnership set in a Sheffield Shield match. Marcus Harris and Will Pucovski of Victoria scored 486 runs for the first wicket, in the match against South Australia. The previous record was held by Mark and Steve Waugh, making 464 for New South Wales against Western Australia in the 1990–91 tournament.

On 16 December 2020, Cricket Australia confirmed the remaining schedule of the tournament, when the tournament was shortened by one round. On 10 February 2021, the tournament was shortened further by one round, with the final starting on 15 April 2021. Queensland won the tournament, beating New South Wales by an innings and 33 runs in the final.

Points table

Round-Robin stage

Round 1

Round 2

Round 3

Round 4

Round 5

Round 6

Round 7

Round 8

Final

References

External links
 Series home at ESPN Cricinfo

Sheffield Shield
Sheffield Shield
Sheffield Shield seasons
Sheffield Shield season, 2020-21